Kesarat is a surname. Notable people with the surname include:

Tanaboon Kesarat (born 1993), Thai football player
Somjets Kesarat (born 1980), Thai football player